Shamsul Islam is a politician from Jamalpur District of Bangladesh. He was elected a member of parliament from Jamalpur-4 in 1988 Bangladeshi general election.

Career 
Shamsul Islam was elected a Member of Parliament from Jamalpur-4 constituency as an independent candidate in the 1988 Bangladeshi general election.

References 

Living people
Year of birth missing (living people)
People from Jamalpur District
Jatiya Party (Ershad) politicians
4th Jatiya Sangsad members